James Hoey may refer to:
 James Hoey (politician) (1828–1903), politician in the Northwest Territories, Canada
 Jimmy Hoey (1901–1988), rugby league footballer of the 1930s for England and Widnes
 Jim Hoey (born 1982), American baseball player